Bagot may refer to:

People
Alec Bagot (1893–1968), Australian adventurer, polemicist and politician
Baron Bagot, title in the Peerage of Great Britain
Charles Bagot (1781–1843), English diplomat and colonial administrator
Charles Hervey Bagot (1788–1880), South Australian parliamentarian
John Bagot (disambiguation), several people 
Josceline Bagot (1854–1913), British army officer and MP
Lewis Bagot (1740–1802), Anglican cleric
Milicent Bagot (1907–2006), British intelligence officer
Richard Bagot (disambiguation), several people
Richard Bagot (writer) (1860–1921), English novelist and essayist
Richard Bagot (bishop) (1782–1854), English cleric
Theodosia Bagot (1865–1940), British nurse and benefactor 
Walter Bagot (disambiguation), several people
Sir Walter Bagot (died 1622) (1557–1622/23), Member of Parliament for Tamworth
Sir Walter Bagot, 3rd Baronet (1644–1704), English barrister and landowner
Sir Walter Bagot, 5th Baronet (1702–1768), English Member of Parliament
Walter Bagot (priest) (1731–1806), English cleric and landowner
Walter Bagot (architect) (1880–1963), South Australian architect
William Bagot (disambiguation), several people
William Bagot (politician) (died 1407), favourite of King Richard II of England and a major character :in Shakespeare's Richard II
William Bagot, 1st Baron Bagot (1728–1798), British politician
William Bagot, 2nd Baron Bagot (1773–1856), British peer
William Bagot, 3rd Baron Bagot (1811–1887), British courtier and Conservative politician
William Bagot, 4th Baron Bagot (1857–1932), British peer and Conservative politician

Places
Bagot (electoral district), former Quebec electoral district
Bagot (provincial electoral district), former Quebec provincial electoral district
Bagot (Province of Canada), a district of Quebec established in 1853
Bagot, Manitoba, an unincorporated community in Manitoba
Bagot's Wood, a wood in Staffordshire, England
Bagot, Northern Territory, an aboriginal community in Darwin, Australia

Other
Bagot goat, a British breed of semi-wild goat
Rush–Bagot Treaty, a treaty of 1817 between the US and the UK

See also
Walter Bagehot, British journalist
Woods Bagot, a global architecture and consulting studio originating in South Australia
Hundred of Bagot (disambiguation)